Genādijs Šitiks (18 June 1958 – 20 August 2009) was a Latvian football manager and a former footballer, one of Latvia's best footballers of the 1980s.

Playing and coaching career

Šitiks learned the basics of football at the Riga football school, but his first serious team was VEF Rīga where he played under Georgijs Smirnovs. In 1978 Šitiks was named the best midfielder of the Latvian league and the 1979 season he started as a player of Daugava Rīga. With Daugava he played until 1991, making more than 400 appearances and scoring 108 goals. His best seasons came in 1981 - 21 goal in 41 matches and 1986 - 18 goals in 43 matches (and he was a midfielder, not a forward). In 1986 Šitiks was the third best scorer in the Soviet First League, together with Aleksandrs Starkovs he was one of the most important players in the 1980s Daugava team. In 1986 Šitiks was invited to training with the Soviet Olympic football team, but Daugava head coach Jānis Skredelis decided not to inform Šitiks about that fact.

When the Soviet Union collapsed Šitiks went first to Sweden, then to Poland but soon he retired from football. Still he played for Latvia national football team in its first four matches. In 1996 Šitiks as a playing coach led FK Vecrīga to victory in the Latvia 1. līga tournament, earning promotion to Virslīga, however because of limited finances the club declined to play in Virslīga and became disfunct.

Šitiks founded a football school in Riga and devoted his life to coaching young football talents. He was also appointed the head coach of Latvia national under-21 football team.

Death

On 20 August 2009, Latvian Football Federation reported that Šitiks had died of unknown causes.

Honours
 Baltic Cup
 1993

References

External links

1958 births
Soviet footballers
Latvian footballers
Latvian football managers
Latvia international footballers
Daugava Rīga players
Expatriate footballers in Sweden
Expatriate footballers in Poland
Footballers from Riga
2009 deaths
Latvian expatriate sportspeople in Poland
Latvian sports coaches
Latvian expatriate footballers
Association football midfielders
Latvian expatriate sportspeople in Sweden